Oinoi railway station is a station on the Piraeus–Platy railway line in Oinoi in Boeotia, Greece. Located near the Motorway 1, and a short distance south of Oinoi. It is situated at the junction of the main Piraeus–Platy railway and the branch line to Chalcis (Oinoi–Chalcis railway). It is served by InterCity trains between Athens and Thessaloniki, and by Athens Suburban Railway services to Chalcis.

History
The station opened on 29 June 1904 as a junction of the Oinoi–Chalcis line and Piraeus, Demerli & Frontiers Railway. In 1920 the station and most of the standard gauge railways in Greece came under the control of the Hellenic State Railways (SEK). In 1970 OSE became the legal successor to the SEK, taking over responsibilities for most of Greece's rail infrastructure. On 1 January 1971, the station and most of the Greek rail infrastructure were transferred to the Hellenic Railways Organisation S.A., a state-owned corporation. Freight traffic declined sharply when the state-imposed monopoly of OSE for the transport of agricultural products and fertilisers ended in the early 1990s. Many small stations of the network with little passenger traffic were closed down.

In 2001 the infrastructure element of OSE was created, known as GAIAOSE; it would henceforth be responsible for the maintenance of stations, bridges and other elements of the network, as well as the leasing and the sale of railway assists. In 2003, OSE launched "Proastiakos SA", as a subsidiary to serve the operation of the suburban network in the urban complex of Athens during the 2004 Olympic Games. In 2005, TrainOSE was created as a brand within OSE to concentrate on rail services and passenger interface. In 2008, all Athens Suburban Railway services were transferred from OSE to TrainOSE.

In 2009, with the Greek debt crisis unfolding OSE's Management was forced to reduce services across the network. Timetables were cutback and routes closed, as the government-run entity attempted to reduce overheads. In 2017 OSE's passenger transport sector was privatised as TrainOSE, currently a wholly-owned subsidiary of Ferrovie dello Stato Italiane infrastructure, including stations, remained under the control of OSE. In July 2022, the station began being served by Hellenic Train, the rebranded TrainOSE.

Facilities
The ground-level station is assessed via stairs or a ramp. It has 1 side platform and 2 island platforms, with the main station buildings located on the eastbound platform, (As of 2020) the station has a staffed booking office, a buffet, as well as toilets and waiting shelters are available, with access to the platforms by stairs or lifts. The Station is housed in the original stone-built station (Now closed) At platform level, there are sheltered seating and Dot-matrix display departure and arrival screens and timetable poster boards on platform 1, with platform shelters on the island platforms. There is a car park at the station and a taxi rank on the forecourt.

Services

Since 15 May 2022, the following weekday services call at this station:

Station layout

See also
Hellenic Railways Organization
TrainOSE
Proastiakos
P.A.Th.E./P.

References

External links
 Oinoi railway station - National Railway Network Greek Travel Pages

Transport in Boeotia
Railway stations in Central Greece
Railway stations opened in 1904
Buildings and structures in Boeotia